Douglass Stott Parker, Sr. (May 27, 1927 – February 8, 2011) was an American classicist, academic, and translator.

Born in LaPorte, Indiana, the son of Cyril Rodney Parker and Isobel (née Douglass) Parker, Douglass received an undergraduate degree from the University of Michigan and a doctorate from Princeton University.  He was also a Fellow at the Center for Hellenic Studies in 1961-1962, its inaugural year, and a Guggenheim Scholar. His translation of The Congresswomen (Ecclesiazusae) was among the Finalists for The National Book Award in the category of Translation in 1968.

Parker is known for his work in Greek and Roman comedy, particularly his translations of Aristophanes’ plays Lysistrata (1964), The Wasps (1962) and The Congresswomen (Ecclesiazusae) (1967).  He is also known for his translations of Terence’s The Eunuch (Eunuchus), and Plautus' The Brothers Menaechmus (Menaechmi), as well as other classical and literary works.  His translations of plays have been republished multiple times, and have been performed around the world.  Lysistrata has had over two hundred productions.

Parker was Professor of Classics at the University of Texas at Austin for forty years, recruited there in 1967 by William Arrowsmith.  Earlier he had been a professor at Yale (1953-55) and at the University of California, Riverside (1955-67).  He taught classes in Greek and Latin languages and literature, as well as a discipline of his own creation, parageography—the study of imaginary worlds.  His courses crossed traditional disciplinary boundaries and were popular; he was known at the University of Texas for his breadth of knowledge and teaching, and won graduate and undergraduate teaching awards.  In 2011 the Journal Didaskalia dedicated its new endeavors to "Douglass Parker, who embodied the interplay between scholarship and practice, between an acute understanding of the ancient world and a keen sense of modern audience."  Didaskalia subsequently published a pair of wide-ranging interviews from 1981 and 1982.

Parker had a passion for jazz, playing the trombone throughout his life, and elements of jazz improvisation and creativity were themes in his research and teaching.  He also had interests in fantasy and science fiction, and published one of the first scholarly analyses of Tolkien's 'The Lord of the Rings.  Creativity and fantasy are foundations of imaginary worlds—including those of the Odyssey, the Land of Oz, and Middle Earth—and in parageography Parker sought insight on the creative process of writing.  He referred to the parageography course as "a course in 'Applied Creativity'".

Parker often combined elements of creativity with comedy, and starting in 1979 for example, developed installments of Zeus in Therapy, a series of humorous verse monologues in which Zeus reflects on his experiences and complains to his therapist about difficulties of managing the universe.  The imagined sessions in these installments get at the power of one's innermost thoughts. A theatrical adaptation of "Zeus in Therapy" was developed by the Tutto Theatre Company in August 2013.

Parker died after a bout with cancer in Austin, Texas, at age 83.  He suggested that his epitaph read: "but I digress...".

Works

Notes

External links
douglassparker.org, which has a freely-downloadable PDF eBook about the Parageography Course and PDF eBook about the Parageography Library
Google Books entries for Douglass Parker
David Stokes, homage to Douglass Parker, Parageography, Issue 1, Summer 2003
Tribute to Parker by the University of Texas College of Liberal Arts
Didaskalia memorial to Douglass Parker
CAMWS memorial: Douglass Parker
Video clips (2000) of the Thiasos Theater Company production of Douglass Parker's translation of Aristophanes' Wealth, from BBC2's documentary series The Road to Riches
Video clips (2001) of the Thiasos Theater Company production of Douglass Parker's translation of Aristophanes' Peace
Tutto Theatre Company's original stage adaptation of Zeus in Therapy, August 2013

1927 births
2011 deaths
People from La Porte, Indiana
American classical scholars
Greek–English translators
Latin–English translators
University of Michigan alumni
Princeton University alumni
Classical scholars of the University of Texas at Austin
University of California, Riverside faculty
Classical scholars of Yale University
American jazz trombonists
Male trombonists
20th-century American translators
American male jazz musicians